The Sioux City Central High School and Central Annex, also known as the Castle on the Hill, are historic buildings located in Sioux City, Iowa, United States.  The high school building was listed on the National Register of Historic Places in 1974.  The annex was added to the historic designation in 2016.

History
The building was designed by Joliet, Illinois architect F.S. Allen, and built by contractor Eric Lund of Minneapolis.  The Gothic Revival and Romanesque Revival structure was built for $104,460, and it reflects the flamboyant attitude of the community during a period of economic expansion.  The exterior is composed of brownish-pink Lake Superior Sandstone.  It features a large central bell tower that is flanked by two projecting pavilions that are capped by a stepped-gable roof, and turrets at the corners.  Initially, this was a three-story building capped with a hipped roof.

By 1911 the building had become too small.  The north wing was completed in 1912 for $225,000, and it was designed to complement the original building.  The stone was purposely smoked to match the older stone.  The school received the name Central High School in 1924 when other schools were built.  The building was expanded again in 1930 when the hipped roof was removed and the fourth floor was added.  The whole interior of the building was also remodeled at that time.  The final expansion was the brick annex that was built to the south of the main building.  Central High School was closed in 1972 when three new high schools were built in the city.  

The Castle on the Hill Association acquired the building from the local school district for $1 in 1976.  Initially, it housed various nonprofit organizations.  NuStyle Development Corporation of Woodbine, Iowa converted the building into apartments.  After extensive renovations the Castle on the Hill Apartments were opened in 2003.  In May 2016 plans to convert the annex into 50 more apartments were unveiled.

References

School buildings completed in 1892
Romanesque Revival architecture in Iowa
School buildings on the National Register of Historic Places in Iowa
National Register of Historic Places in Sioux City, Iowa
Apartment buildings in Sioux City, Iowa
Defunct schools in Iowa
1892 establishments in Iowa